Katie Carroll is an American singer-songwriter from Dallas, Texas. She released her debut album, Paper Girl, on August 13, 2010. The Dallas Observer reported that her song, "Paper Girl", was No. 32 in Dallas for the year 2010. Her second album, Desperada, was released in 2012.

Discography

Albums
 Paper Girl (2010)
 Desperada (2012)

References

Living people
American women pop singers
American women singer-songwriters
Musicians from Dallas
Singer-songwriters from Texas
Year of birth missing (living people)
21st-century American women